Mercury(II) fluoride has the molecular formula HgF2 as a chemical compound of one atom of mercury with 2 atoms of fluorine.

Synthesis
Mercury(II) fluoride is most commonly produced by the reaction of mercury(II) oxide and hydrogen fluoride:
HgO + 2 HF → HgF2 + H2O

Mercury(II) fluoride can also be produced through the fluorination of mercury(II) chloride:
HgCl2 + F2 → HgF2 + Cl2

or of mercury(II) oxide:
2 HgO + 2 F2 → 2 HgF2 + O2
with oxygen as byproduct.

Applications
Mercury(II) fluoride is a selective fluorination agent.

References

Fluorides
Mercury(II) compounds
Metal halides
Fluorinating agents
Fluorite crystal structure